Arak, Arack or Araq may refer to:

Places
 Arak, Algeria, a village in In Amguel Commune of Tamanrasset Province, Algeria
 Arak gorges, a series of gorges in Algeria
 Arak, Iran, a city in Markazi Province, Iran
 Arak County, an administrative subdivision centred on the city
Araq, Iran, a village in North Khorasan Province, Iran
 Arak, Mengen, a village in Bolu Province, Turkey
 Arak, Republic of Dagestan, a rural locality in Dagestan, Russia
 Arak, Syria, a historic desert town in Syria

Beverages
 Arak (drink), an alcoholic beverage of the Eastern Mediterranean
 Arrack, an alcoholic beverage of South and Southeast Asia

Other uses
 Arak (character), the hero of Arak, Son of Thunder, a comic book published by DC Comics
 Arak University, Arak, Iran
 Arak, a tree or shrub, species Salvadora persica

See also 
 
 Arac (disambiguation)
 Araki (disambiguation)
 Araqi (disambiguation)
 Arrakis (disambiguation)